Harold Francis Rowe  was a New Zealand rugby footballer who was part of the professional 1907–08 New Zealand rugby tour of Australia and Great Britain.

Early life
He was born on July 10, 1883. His parents were Martha Bell and Francis Rowe. In 1914 he married Hilda Laura Norton. Rowe was a qualified accountant. They had at least two children (Harold Norton Rowe, 1914 and Gladys Ruth Rowe, 1917).

Playing career

Rugby union career

Rugby league career
He was selected for the professional All Blacks  tour of 1907–1908, in part because of his utility value. Rowe became an invaluable part of the touring team and between 1907 and 1909 he was to play in nine rugby league test matches. In 1908 he played in the first ever trans-Tasman test which was the début match of the Australia national rugby league team. He scored two tries in the second test match against Australia, a game which New Zealand won 11–10 to clinch the series. Rowe finished the tour with ten tries overall, including touring games.

In 1909 he again toured Australia with the New Zealand side.

Like many of the touring party he later returned to England, signing with Leeds in September 1909.

Challenge Cup Final appearances
Harold Rowe did not play (Jimmy Fawcett played ) in Leeds' 7–7 draw with Hull F.C. in the 1910 Challenge Cup Final during the 1909–10 season at Fartown Ground, Huddersfield, on Saturday 16 April 1910, in front of a crowd of 19,413, this was the first Challenge Cup Final to be drawn, but played , i.e. number 2, and scored a try in the 26–12 victory over Hull F.C. in the 1909–10 Challenge Cup Final replay during the 1909–10 season at Fartown Ground, Huddersfield on Monday 18 April 1910, in front of a crowd of 11,608, this was Leeds' first Challenge Cup Final win in their first appearance.

References

Auckland rugby league team players
Auckland rugby union players
Leeds Rhinos players
New Zealand accountants
New Zealand national rugby league team players
New Zealand rugby league players
New Zealand rugby union players
Rugby league centres
Rugby league fullbacks
Rugby league wingers
Rugby union centres
Rugby union fullbacks
1883 births
1958 deaths